There are three 2010 All-Pro Teams—one each named by the Associated Press (AP), Pro Football Writers Association (PFWA), and Sporting News—for performance in the 2010 NFL season. While none of these have the official imprimatur of the NFL (whose official recognition is nomination to the 2011 Pro Bowl), they are included (separately) in the NFL Record and Fact Book. Any player selected to any of the teams can be described as an "All-Pro."

The AP team, with first- and second-team selections, was chosen by a national panel of 50 NFL writers; the Sporting News selection process uses a panel of 50 NFL coaches and executives, while the PFWA team is chosen by polling its 300+ members.

Teams

Each AP voter is given one vote per slot (e.g., voters vote for one QB, two WRs, etc.). The Second Team consists of the runners-up at each position (e.g., the second-highest vote getter at QB, the third- and fourth-highest at RB, etc.). Tom Brady was a unanimous selection for All-Pro QB, so there is no Second Team QB.
Only the AP designates fullbacks.
The Sporting News groups all linebackers together and names three total, the PFWA names two outside and one inside (middle) linebacker (as in a 4-3 defense), while the AP designates two outside and two inside linebackers.
The AP does not designate a punt returner.
Only PFWA designates a special teams player.

Key
 AP = Associated Press first-team All-Pro
 AP-2 = Associated Press second-team All-Pro
 AP-2t = Tied for second-team All-Pro in the AP vote
 PFWA = Pro Football Writers Association All-NFL
 SN = Sporting News All-Pro

References

2010 Sporting News All-Pro Team
2010 PFWA All-NFL Team

All-Pro Teams
Allpro